The National Computational Infrastructure (also known as NCI or NCI Australia) is a high-performance computing and data services facility, located at the Australian National University (ANU) in Canberra, Australian Capital Territory. The NCI is supported by the Australian Government's National Collaborative Research Infrastructure Strategy (NCRIS), with operational funding provided through a formal collaboration incorporating CSIRO, the Bureau of Meteorology, the Australian National University, Geoscience Australia, the Australian Research Council, and a number of research intensive universities and medical research institutes. 

Access to computational resources is provided to funding partners as well as researchers awarded grants under the National Computing Merit Allocation Scheme (NCMAS).

The current director is Sean Smith.

Notable staff
 Lindsay Botten - former director
 Chris Pigram - former CEO of Geoscience Australia and acting director after the retirement of Lindsay Botten.
 Sean Smith - current director

Facility
The NCI building is located on the ANU campus in Canberra and uses hot aisle containment and free cooling to cool their computers.

Computer systems
As of June 2020, NCI operates two main high-performance computing installations, including:

 Gadi, meaning 'to search for' in the local Ngunnawal language. a 9.26 PetaFLOP high-performance distributed memory cluster consisting of:
 145,152 cores (Intel Xeon Scalable 'Cascade Lake' processors) across 3024 nodes
 160 nodes containing four Nvidia V100 GPUs
 567 Terabytes of main memory
 20 Petabytes of fast storage
 47 Petabytes of storage for large data files
 50 Petabytes of tape storage for archival
 HDR Mellanox Infiniband in Dragonfly+ topology (up to 200Gbit/s transfer)
 Tenjin, a 67 TeraFLOP bespoke high-performance partner cloud, consisting of:
 1600 Intel Xeon Sandy Bridge cores
 25 Terabytes main memory
 160 Terabytes State Disk

Data services and storage
NCI operates the fastest filesystems in the Southern Hemisphere. 20 Petabytes of storage is available for fast I/O, 47 Petabytes is available for large data and research files, and 50 Petabytes is available on tape for archival.

Datasets
NCI hosts multiple data sets that can be used on their computation systems including:
 Aboriginal and Torres Strait Islander Data Archive (ATSIDA) which provides Australian Indigenous research data
 Australian Astronomy Optical Data Repository (ODR) including: 
 Anglo-Australian Telescope (AAT) current and selected historical datasets
 Southern Sky Survey, using the ANU's robotic SkyMapper telescope at Mount Stromlo Observatory
 Australian National Geophysical Collection (300TB in 2015) including:
 Airborne geophysics data
 Gravity data set
 Seismic survey
 High resolution 'raw' Indian Ocean sea floor data generated as part of the search for Malaysia Airlines Flight 370.

Research
Research conducted or under way includes:

 Southern Sky Survey, using the ANU's robotic SkyMapper telescope at Mount Stromlo Observatory
 The Australian Community Climate and Earth System Simulator (ACCESS)
 COVID-19 mitigation research
 Medical and materials research

History
NCI Australia is a direct descendant of the ANU Supercomputing Facility ANUSF, which existed from 1987 through to 1999. At the turn of the new millennium, the Australian Government pushed ahead with a process to form the Australian Partnership for Advanced Computing (APAC), the foundation of which would be built around a new national computational infrastructure. With its heritage in supercomputing, it was decided that the APAC National Facility would be located at The Australian National University, with the facility ultimately commissioned in 2001.

In 2007, APAC began its evolution into the present NCI collaboration.

The below table is a comprehensive history of supercomputer specifications present at the NCI and its antecedents.

See also 

 Pawsey Supercomputing Centre
 CSIRO
 Geoscience Australia
 TOP500

References

External links 

 NCI Australia website

Supercomputer sites
2000s establishments in Australia
University research institutes
Research institutes in Australia
Computer science research organizations